The Juice Box is a low-cost multimedia player made by toy manufacturer Mattel. The player features a  screen with a native resolution of 240×160 px and runs μClinux, a microcontroller version of the Linux kernel. It was made and released in November 2004, and was discontinued in early 2005. It has 66 MHz ARM7TDMI architecture Samsung processor S3C44B0, 2 MBytes or 8 MBytes of RAM and 8MB of ROM. It was marketed as a portable media player for children (like its competitors VideoNow and Game Boy Advance Video). The player only played a proprietary cartridge format. 4Kids Entertainment and Cartoon Network put some of their shows on cartridges. However, the small screen and poor quality (10 frames per second maximum) alienated most people. Furthermore, the device entered a crowded market. Its rivals are the VideoNow and the Game Boy Advance, the GBA being the most potent. The difference is that GBA not only had TV shows (which can be played through Game Boy Advance Video cartridges), but could also play video games, as it was built for that. Thus many retail stores were left with a surplus of the device. Original retail price was about US$70.

Shows included on Juice Box

Cartoon Network
Codename: Kids Next Door (Operation: BEACH / Operation: UNDERCOVER / Operation: FUTURE)
Courage the Cowardly Dog (The Duck Brothers / Shirley the Medium / The Mask)
Dexter's Laboratory (Beard to be Feared / Quackor the Fowl / Ant Pants / Dexter's Lab: A Story / Coupon for Craziness / Better Off Wet)
Ed, Edd & Eddy (Urban Ed / Eenie, Meenie, Miney, Ed / Ed or Tails / Boys Will Be Eds)
Megas XLR (Test Drive / All I Wanted Was a Slushie)
The Grim Adventures of Billy and Mandy (Who Killed Who? / Tween Wolf / Daddy's Little Spider / Tricycle of Terror)
The Powerpuff Girls (Slave the Day / Los Dos Mojos / Bubble Vision / Bought and Scold)
Johnny Bravo (Jumbo Johnny / Bravo, James Bravo / The Sensitive Male / The Man Who Cried Clown / Johnny Real Good / Talky Tabitha)

4Kids
Teenage Mutant Ninja Turtles (Shredder Strikes Parts 1 and 2 / The Ultimate Ninja)
Winx Club (Save the First Dance)
Sonic X (Missile Wrist Rampage)
Yu-Gi-Oh! (Clash in the Coliseum, Part 1)

WWE
"Hard Knocks: The Chris Benoit Story" (2004)
"Eugene"
"Rey Mysterio: 619-Style"

Other
Two and a Half Men: The Complete First Season

Documentaries
Jerry Rice: The Ultimate Wide Receiver (1996)
Drake Bell: A Day with Drake
Good Times with Carey Hart
Brett Favre: The Field General (1996)

Music Videos
Ashlee Simpson: Shadow / Ashlee Simpson: Pieces of Me / The Cure: The End of the World / Vanessa Carlton: White Houses / Fan 3: Geek Love
Gavin DeGraw: I Don't Want to Be / Howie Day: Collide / Three Days Grace: I Hate Everything About You / Fuel: Falls on Me
Avril Lavigne: My Happy Ending / Avril Lavigne: Don't Tell Me / The Calling: Our Lives / Clay Aiken: The Way / Ruben Studdard: Superstar
Liz Phair: Extraordinary / Liz Phair: Why Can't I? / Stacie Orrico: (There's Gotta Be) More to Life / Sarah Hudson: Girl on the Verge / Steriogram: Walkie Talkie Man
Baha Men: Move It Like This / Jump5: Do Ya / Jump5: Spinnin' Around / Beu Sisters: I Was Only (Seventeen) / ZOEgirl: Dismissed
Kenny Chesney (Live Those Songs / No Shoes, No Shirt, No Problems / I Go Back) / Sara Evans: Suds in the Bucket / Martina McBride: This One's for the Girls
The Roots: Don't Say Nuthin' / LL Cool J: Headsprung / LL Cool J featuring 7 Aurelius: Hush / Keyshia Cole: I Changed My Mind
Steriogram: Walkie Talkie Man / tobyMac: Get This Party Started / Relient K: Chapstick, Chapped Lips, and Things Like Chemistry
ZOEgirl: You Get Me / Jump5: All I Can Do / Jump 5: Spinnin' Around / Baha Men: Who Let the Dogs Out / Atomic Kitten: Eternal Flame

See also 
VideoNow
Game Boy Advance Video

References 

2000s toys
Mattel
Media players
Products introduced in 2004